Ondrej Hambálek (born 13 September 1973) is a Slovak rower. He competed in the men's double sculls event at the 1996 Summer Olympics.

References

External links
 

1973 births
Living people
Slovak male rowers
Olympic rowers of Slovakia
Rowers at the 1996 Summer Olympics
Sportspeople from Bratislava